The Royal West Sussex Hospital is a former hospital and Grade II* listed building in Chichester, West Sussex, England.

History 
In 1784, the Reverend William Walker and Dr Thomas Sanden established the Chichester Dispensary.

It was renamed the Royal West Sussex Hospital in 1913.

During the 1940 Battle of Britain, the hospital treated wounded servicemen.

The building was listed for protection on 8 October 1971.

References 

Grade II* listed hospital buildings
Grade II* listed buildings in West Sussex
Buildings and structures in Chichester